USS Hartley may refer to:

USS Hartley (1875), was built at San Francisco in 1875. Acquired from the Coast Guard for use in World War I, she served as a harbor patrol ship out of San Francisco. Hartley was returned to the Coast Guard 15 February 1919
, was a  launched in November 1956 and sold to Columbia in 1972

United States Navy ship names